Andrei Grigorevich Yermakov (Ермаков, Андрей Григорьевич ; born March 12, 1994) is a Russian professional ice hockey defenceman. He is currently playing with Yuzhny Ural Orsk of the Supreme Hockey League (VHL).

Yermakov made his Kontinental Hockey League (KHL) debut playing with HC Spartak Moscow during the 2013–14 KHL season.

Awards and honors

References

External links

1994 births
Living people
Admiral Vladivostok players
HC CSKA Moscow players
SKA Saint Petersburg players
HC Sibir Novosibirsk players
HC Spartak Moscow players
Russian ice hockey defencemen
Ice hockey people from Moscow
Torpedo Nizhny Novgorod players